is a Japanese dark fantasy manga series written and illustrated by Maybe. It has been serialized in Kodansha's Bessatsu Shōnen Magazine since June 2014. The manga is licensed for English release in North America by Vertical. A 12-episode anime television series adaptation by MAPPA was broadcast from July to September 2019.

Plot
100 years after settlers on the continent of Patria established a democratic nation, the discovery of an energy source called Somnium ore sparked a conflict. The nation of Patria split between the industrial Northern Union and the mining towns of the Southern Confederation, and began fighting a civil war. While the South had greater numbers, the North had a secret weapon: The Incarnates, soldiers who could transform into giant mythical beasts and single-handedly destroy enemy emplacements. However, when the war ended and a peace treaty was negotiated, the Incarnates were supposed to be destroyed. Instead, an officer named Cain betrayed his superiors and fled with the surviving Incarnates across the continent. Two years later, an Incarnate named Hank has made it his mission to hunt down the surviving Incarnates, assisted by a young woman named Char who blames him for killing her father.

Characters

Main

Former Captain of the Incarnates who was left for dead near the end of the war. Two months later, he became a Beast Hunter, hunting down the surviving Incarnates across Patria before they cause more destruction. He is capable of transforming into a werewolf under moonlight, and fights with a giant spear. 

The daughter of John William Bancroft, she holds Hank responsible for his death and tries to shoot Hank the first time she meets him. Schaal wields an elephant gun and reluctantly decides to help Hank in exchange for learning the truth of the Incarnates and what caused them to go insane.

 
Formerly a nobleman named Cain Withers, he was Vice Captain of the Incarnates who betrayed Elaine near the end of the war, shooting her through the chest before fleeing with the surviving Incarnate soldiers. He is called the vampire Incarnate, the immortal king of blood and the night.

A doctor whose research gave birth to the Incarnates, and also developed a means to kill them at the end of the war. However, she was shot through the chest by Cain before she could do the job. Later in the series, she is held in a glass container by Cain Madhouse.

 
A human and the Captain of Coup de Grace, an Incarnate Extermination Squad authorized by the government. He takes his job seriously and swears he will not smile until he has killed every Incarnate beast. Unknown to most people, he is the younger brother of Cain and has sworn to kill him for his rebellion.

A spy from the Northern Union who feeds information to Hank about the Incarnates.

A young white-haired girl with gold eyes and a black dress who travels with Cain.

Incarnate Soldiers

A man who ran a local orphanage with his daughter. After the war he returned to continue caring for the children even though he was stuck in his Beast form, but after a while started to scare the local villagers when he would start screaming in the middle of the night which had the orphans taken away for their safety. He was killed by Hank with his daughter witnessing the shooting, but not the events before then.

A former Incarnate soldier with chameleon abilities who used his power to rob people's house after the war is over, as well as killing people who lives there, he was the first Incarnate to be killed by Hank after took an oath.

A relatively easygoing young man that has a rhino appearance. He attempted to return to a normal life in his hometown of Barn Wood, but Hank revealed that he was suspected of robbing nearby caravans to provide for his family. 

A cowardly young man who joined the Northern Army before he was inspired by Hank. After returning home to Rogue Hill, he grew increasingly paranoid and turned the town into his personal labyrinthine fortress to defend himself from all perceived threats.

A soft-spoken soldier who rarely talked about himself and followed orders without question. As the Behemoth, he wanders East for reasons unknown, while trying to avoid heavily-populated areas.

A young man who often found solace in the teachings of the Church before joining the Army. Currently stuck in Gargoyle form, he metes out his own version of justice to the "sinners" of White Church.

 A former lounge singer whose joined to end the war quickly so people can enjoy songs again. Her ability puts people to sleep making them incapable of resisting. One of the few Incarnates who tried to avoid hurting humans after the war.

Known commonly as "Roy", he was formerly a field soldier for Northern Union of Patria on the front lines of the Civil War where his platoon was wiped out with him as the only surrivor. Sometime later, he met up with Cain and Hank where he became close friends with Hank as a fellow wolf Incarnate.

Media

Manga
Written and illustrated by the duo Maybe, To the Abandoned Sacred Beasts started in Kodansha's shōnen manga magazine Bessatsu Shōnen Magazine on 9 June 2014. The series took a one-month break in August 2015 (it was not published in the September issue on 8 August) before resuming serialization in the October issue on 9 September 2015. The series is set to end on 9 May 2023. Kodansha has collected its chapters into individual tankōbon volumes. The first volume was released on 9 December 2014. As of 7 October 2022, fourteen volumes have been released.

North American manga publisher Vertical announced their license to the series in August 2015. Before they selected the series' current title, Vertical was originally going to publish the manga as The Abandoned Sacred Beasts. The first volume was published on 17 May 2016.

Volume list

Chapters not yet in tankōbon format

Anime

An anime television series adaptation was announced on 5 February 2019. The series is animated by MAPPA and directed by Jun Shishido, with Shigeru Murakoshi handled the series composition, Daisuke Niinuma designed the characters, and Yoshihiro Ike composed the music. The series aired from 1 July to 16 September 2019 on Tokyo MX, BS11, and MBS. Crunchyroll streamed the series. It ran for 12 episodes. On 1 October 2019, Crunchyroll announced that the series would receive an English dub.

Reception
The first volume of the series reached 39th place on the weekly Oricon comics rankings, with 22,468 copies sold; the second volume reached 31st place, with 18,638 copies sold; the third volume reached 39th place, with 28,018 copies sold; and the fourth volume reached 24th place, with 32,728 copies sold.

See also
Dusk Maiden of Amnesia, another manga series with the same creator
Tales of Wedding Rings, another manga series with the same creator

Works cited

References

External links
  at Bessatsu Shōnen Magazine 
  
 

2019 anime television series debuts
Action anime and manga
Anime series based on manga
Crunchyroll anime
Dark fantasy anime and manga
Kodansha manga
MAPPA
NBCUniversal Entertainment Japan
Anime and manga about revenge
Shōnen manga
Vertical (publisher) titles
Norse mythology in anime and manga
Tokyo MX original programming